USS O-6 (SS-67) was an O-class submarine of the United States Navy which served in both world wars.

Service history

Construction and commissioning
Her keel was laid down on 6 December 1916 by Fore River Shipbuilding Company in Quincy, Massachusetts. She was launched on 25 November 1917 sponsored by Mrs. Carroll Q. Wright (daughter of Army Major John Leslie Shepard and wife of the boat's prospective commanding officer).  O-6 was commissioned at Boston, Massachusetts, on 12 June 1918.

World War I
During the final months of World War I, O-6 operated out of Philadelphia, Pennsylvania, on coastal patrol against U-boats, cruising from Cape Cod to Key West, Florida.

A British merchantman fired six shots at O-6 on 14 July 1918.  Excerpts from the autobiography of Captain (then Lieutenant) Wright relate that the first two shells landed on either side of the sub.  Taking evasive action and emergency diving resulted in several shells hitting the sub and damaging the conning tower, the 3-inch gun, and the bridge shield. Otherwise, had the captain not taken evasive action, the submarine would have been sunk.  For his actions which saved the boat from sinking, Lieutenant Wright was awarded the British Distinguished Service Cross.  He was promoted to Lieutenant Commander on 15 August.

On 2 November 1918 the O-6 departed Newport in a 20-submarine contingent bound for service in European waters, however, the Armistice with Germany had been signed before the vessels reached the Azores, and they returned to the United States.

Interwar period
After the war, O-6 prolonged her Naval career by operating as a training ship out of New London, Connecticut.  Reclassified to a second line submarine on 25 July 1924 while stationed at Coco Solo in the Panama Canal Zone, she reverted to first line class on 6 June 1928 and continued at New London until February 1929, when she steamed to Philadelphia, Pennsylvania, to decommission there on 9 June 1931.

World War II
Submarines had proved to be a major weapon in World War I. As U.S. involvement in World War II approached, old submarines were taken out of mothballs and prepared to renew training activities. O-6 recommissioned at Philadelphia on 4 February 1941 and then returned to New London to train students at the Submarine School. On 19 June 1941, O-6 made a trial run to Portsmouth, New Hampshire; the next day  went down 15 nautical miles off Portsmouth.

Fate
Remaining in the Portsmouth area, O-6 decommissioned there on 11 September 1945, was struck from the Naval Vessel Register the same day, and was sold to John J. Duane Company of Quincy on 4 September 1946. The boat was subsequently scrapped in December 1946.

Awards
World War I Victory Medal
American Defense Service Medal
American Campaign Medal
World War II Victory Medal

References

External links
 

United States O-class submarines
World War I submarines of the United States
World War II submarines of the United States
Ships built in Quincy, Massachusetts
1917 ships